Usedom Abbey was a medieval Premonstratensian monastery on the isle of Usedom (Western Pomerania, Germany) near the town of Usedom. It was founded in Grobe and later moved to nearby Pudagla, and is thus also known as Grobe Abbey or Pudagla Abbey respectively.

The abbey was founded by the Pomeranian duke Ratibor I and his wife, Pribislawa, in the course of the conversion of Pomerania to Christianity.<ref>Historische Kommission zu Berlin, Freie Universität Berlin. Friedrich-Meinecke-Institut, Jahrbuch für die Geschichte Mittel- und Ostdeutschlands, Ausgabe 47, Niemeyer, 2002, p.425</ref> The exact foundation date is uncertain, but it is assumed that it was about 1155, after the foundation of Stolpe Abbey in 1153 and before Ratibor's death. The first written record is the confirmation of the abbey by the Pomeranian bishop Adalbert of 8 June 1159, which at the same time is the oldest known Pomeranian document.

The site of Grobe Abbey has been archaeologically determined to be Priesterkamp'' hill in the town of Usedom. The monks first came from Magdeburg, later from Havelberg. Shortly after its foundation, Grobe Abbey functioned as the temporary seat of the Pomeranian diocese, before its move to Cammin (Kammin, Kamien) in 1175.

In 1307/09, the abbey was relocated to nearby Pudagla. After the Protestant Reformation, the abbey was secularized into a ducal domain, and from the late 16th century was a refuge for ducal widows.

See also
Conversion of Pomerania
History of Pomerania
Pomerania during the High Middle Ages
Duchy of Pomerania
Bishopric of Cammin
List of Christian religious houses in Mecklenburg-Vorpommern

References

1150s establishments in the Holy Roman Empire
1155 establishments in Europe
Christian monasteries established in the 12th century
Premonstratensian monasteries in Germany
Monasteries in Mecklenburg-Western Pomerania
History of Pomerania
History of Mecklenburg-Western Pomerania
Usedom